The 2018 Northern Ontario Scotties Tournament of Hearts, the Northern Ontario women's curling championship, was held January 11–14 at the Idylwylde Golf & Country Club in Sudbury, Ontario. The winning Tracy Fleury rink represented Northern Ontario at the 2018 Scotties Tournament of Hearts in Penticton, British Columbia.

Teams

Standings
Double Round Robin Format

Results

All draws are listed in Eastern Time (UTC−05:00).

Draw 1
Thursday, January 11, 2:00 pm

Draw 2
Thursday, January 11, 7:30 pm

Draw 3
Friday, January 12, 9:00 am

Draw 4
Friday, January 12, 2:00 pm

Draw 5
Friday, January 12, 7:30 pm

Draw 6
Saturday, January 13, 9:30 am

Final
Saturday, January 13, 7:30 pm

References

Curling competitions in Greater Sudbury
2018 Scotties Tournament of Hearts
 Ontario Scotties Tournament of Hearts
2018 in Ontario
January 2018 sports events in Canada